Be Here is the fourth studio album by New Zealand-born Australian country singer Keith Urban. It was released on 21 September 2004, through Capitol Nashville. With four million copies sold, the album is not only Urban's best-selling album, but also one of the best-selling albums in America by an Australian artist.

The album produced three number 1 singles on the Hot Country Songs chart with "Days Go By", "Making Memories of Us" and "Better Life", as well as the number 2 hits "You're My Better Half" and "Tonight I Wanna Cry". The song "Live to Love Another Day" also peaked at number 48 on the country charts, even though it was not released as a single.

Content
"Making Memories of Us", written by Rodney Crowell, was originally recorded by Tracy Byrd on his 2003 album The Truth About Men. It was also recorded by Crowell himself, along with his backing band The Notorious Cherry Bombs, on their 2004 self-titled album. Nine of the album's songs were written by Urban. Urban produced the tracks "God's Been Good to Me" and "Live to Love Another Day" himself, and then he co-produced the rest of the tracks with Dann Huff.

"Country Comfort" is a cover of a track from Elton John's Tumbleweed Connection.

Critical reception
The album has received positive reviews from Allmusic, BBC, Entertainment Weekly, and Rolling Stone. Three tracks from the album, "Days Go By", "Making Memories of Us", and "Tonight I Want to Cry" were included in an About.com ranking of Urban's top ten songs.

Accolades
Be Here received a Grammy Award nomination for Best Country Album, and won Academy of Country Music Award for Album of the Year. The album was also nominated for Album of the Year at the 40th Annual Country Music Association Awards.

Commercial performance
The album was certified 4× Platinum by Recording Industry Association of America (RIAA), and remains as Urban's best-selling album to date, with sales of 3,639,000 copies in the United States, as of July 2009; it also reached number 8 on the Canadian album chart, number 1 on the Billboard Hot Country Albums chart and number 3 on the Billboard 200.

Track listing

Personnel

 Tim Akers – accordion (tracks 1, 7), keyboards (1–3, 6–7, 10), Hammond organ (9), piano (3)
 Charlie Bisharat – violin (tracks 8–9)
 Bruce Bouton – Dobro guitar (track 9), steel guitar (11)
 Paul Buckmaster – string conductor, string arrangements (tracks 8–9)
 Denyse Buffum – viola (tracks 8–9)
 Tom Bukovac – acoustic guitar (track 12), electric guitar (2–7, 10), slide guitar (7), wah wah guitar (7), additional guitars (1, 3, 8–9, 11, 13)
 Paul Bushnell – bass guitar (tracks 3, 5, 9, 11)
 Matt Chamberlain – drums (tracks 3, 5, 9, 11), percussion (3, 5, 9)
 Larry Corbett – cello (tracks 8–9)
 Eric Darken – percussion (tracks 1–2, 6–8, 10–11, additional: 3)
 Bruce Dukov – violin (tracks 8–9)
 Matt Funes – viola (tracks 8–9)
 Armen Garabedian – violin (tracks 8–9)
 Berj Garabedian – violin (tracks 8–9)
 Endre Granat – violin (tracks 8–9)
 Paula Hochhalter – cello (tracks 8–9)
 Dann Huff – acoustic 12-string guitar (track 3), electric guitar (6), mandolin (1, 11)
 Suzie Katayama – cello (tracks 8–9)
 Peter Kent – violin (tracks 8–9)
 Steven King – accordion (track 13)
 Natalie Leggett – violin (tracks 8–9)
 Chris McHugh – drums (tracks 1–2, 4, 6–8, 10, 12–13), percussion (4, 12)
 Robert Matsuda – violin (tracks 8–9)
 Steve Nathan – piano (track 8)
 Jimmy Nichols – keyboards (5), piano (11), synthesizer strings (9)
 Sara Parkins – violin (tracks 8–9)
 Bob Peterson – violin (tracks 8–9) 
 Kevin Pickle - assistant engineer
 Steve Richards – cello (tracks 8–9)
 Jimmie Lee Sloas – bass guitar (tracks 1–2, 4, 6–8, 10, 12–13)
 Dan Smith – cello (tracks 8–9)
 Charles Stegeman – violin (tracks 8–9)
 Rachel Stegeman – violin (tracks 8–9)
 Rudy Stein – cello (tracks 8–9)
 Russell Terrell – background vocals (tracks 1–3, 5–7, 9–10, 13)
 Chris Thile – mandolin (track 9)
 Keith Urban – banjo (tracks 2, 4, 6–7, 11–13), EBow (1, 5), acoustic 12-string guitar (3), acoustic guitar (1–7, 9–13), electric guitar (1–7, 9–12), hand clapping, mandolin (7, 13), slide guitar (4), lead vocals (All tracks), background vocals (tracks 1–10, 12–13, harmony: 11)
 Josefina Vergara – violin (tracks 8–9)
 Evan Wilson – viola (tracks 8–9)
 Jonathan Yudkin – cello (track 3), fiddle (1, 13)

Charts

Weekly charts

Year-end charts

Singles 

Footnotes
 A: "Tonight I Wanna Cry" charted in Australia in 2011, after it was performed by a contestant on The X Factor Australia.

Certifications

Release history

References

2004 albums
ARIA Award-winning albums
Keith Urban albums
Capitol Records albums
Albums produced by Dann Huff